The , Hob. XXII:7, Novello 8, is a mass in B-flat major by Joseph Haydn. Scored modestly for soprano, four-part mixed choir, two violins, organ and bass, it is known as the Kleine Orgelmesse (Little Organ Mass) due to an extended organ solo in the Benedictus movement.

History 
Haydn composed four or five short masses, depending on the Missa brevis Rorate coeli desuper being composed by him or not. The Missa brevis Sancti Joannis de Deo is his last . All these short masses share a modest orchestra.

Haydn lived in Eisenstadt, working for the court of Nikolaus II, Prince Esterházy. The composition was written in 1774. An organ solo in the Benedictus was common practice at the time.

Haydn played the organ in the first performance, in the hospital chapel of the Brethren in Eisenstadt. "Kleine" (little) may refer to the organ as well as to the composition, because the instrument  there was a positive with six stops without pedal.

Scoring and structure 
The setting of the Latin mass is structured in six movements. It was originally scored for a solo soprano, a four-part choir (SATB), the so-called  (Vienna church trio) of two violins and bass, with an organ which has a solo function in the Benedictus.

In the following table of the movements, the voices, markings, keys and time signatures are taken from the choral score.

Music 
The texts from the order of mass are repeated in every mass and thus well known. The setting of different passages assigned to the different parts, heard simultaneously, does justice to the liturgy but keeps the music short. This setting does, however, take this practice to the extreme, by omitting the words "Et in unum Dominum, Iesum Christum, Filium Dei unigenitum" ("And in one Lord, Jesus Christ, the only-begotten Son of God") from the Credo. The Benedictus is the only movement which is not in B-flat major, and set for a solo voice.

Kyrie 
The Kyrie shows, according to the musicologist John Hsu "brilliant instrumental idioms and choral declamation.

Credo 
The Credo is structured in three parts, the center being formed by an Adagio for the birth, suffering and death of Jesus, delivered by the choir mostly in homophony, accompanied by broken chords in the violins and repetition in the bass. The third section recapitulates music from the Gloria.

Sanctus 
Sanctus is called by the voices in a fast sequence of entries, some as bell-like long notes, other in flowing triplets. For the Osanna, the voices enter from the lowest to the highest, only one measure apart. The instruments play colla parte with the voices, violins with soprano and alto, cello and violone with the bass.

Benedictus 
The Benedictus, the longest movement, is a dialogue of soprano soloist and organ, described as "expressive, elegant, and ornate melodic lines". It is followed by a repeat of the Osanna.

Agnus Dei 
Haydn marked the Agnus Dei carefully for dramatic contrast in dynamics, setting "Agnus Dei" (Lamb of God) as a fortissimo homophonic call versus a pianissimo prayer "Dona nobis pacem" (Give us peace). The end is marked "perdendosi, senza organo" (dying away, without organ), with a pizzicato bass.

A reviewer of the Oxford edition summarized: "The work is accessible to most choirs. The music is not excessively difficult, but the solid musical structure and the many passages requiring expressive singing make
the work a rewarding pleasure for any size choir. H. C. Robbins Landon, an editor of the composition, ascribed to the work a "quiet spirit of devotion, even of mysticism, that is most appealing".

Versions 

While the mass was originally scored for choir, strings and organ, later versions include with trumpets and timpani, and clarinets.

The mass was also used in Salzburg where the textual compression was deemed "unacceptable", therefore the composer's brother Michael Haydn expanded the Gloria, from 31 measures to 118. Very few performances however, use this expansion. However, the Oxford edition presents Michael Haydn's prolongation in the main body of the text and Joseph's short original as an appendix. Johann Georg Albrechtsberger wrote an alternate Benedictus.

References

Bibliography 
 Aston (1989) Peter. "Review" August Music & Letters No. 3, Vol. 70
 Hugues (1974) Rosemary. London. Haydn. J. M. Dent & Sons Ltd
 McCaldin (1989) Denis. Introduction. Oxford. Franz Joseph Haydn: Missa brevis Sancti Joannis de Deo, Hob. XXII:7, Little Organ Mass, with prolongation by Michael Haydn. Oxford University Press

Sources 
 
 
 Jones, Jill Ann: A Historical Study of Joseph Haydn's Missa brevis Sancti Joannis de Deo Hob XXII:7 San Jose State University 1994

Masses by Joseph Haydn
Music for orchestra and organ
1775 compositions
Compositions in B-flat major